Hwang Sun-Pil (Hangul: 황선필; born 14 July 1981) is a South Korean football defender, who last played for Busan IPark in the K-League.

Hwang's professional career began with Daegu FC. In December 2008, he joined Gwangju Sangmu for military service. On 4 January 2011, Hwang transferred to the Chunnam Dragons. On 20 January 2012, he moved to Busan I'Park.

References

External links 

1981 births
Living people
Association football defenders
South Korean footballers
Daegu FC players
Gimcheon Sangmu FC players
Jeonnam Dragons players
Busan IPark players
K League 1 players